The division of Shawinigan was established in 1854, under the Union regime of 1841, after the seats of the Legislative Council of the Province of Canada became elective. It roughly covered the Mauricie area in Quebec and was represented by one Legislative Councillor. Elections were held every six years starting in 1856, renewing a third of the Council every two years.

The first member for the division of Shawinigan was elected in 1862. His term was shortened by the constitutional change of 1867.

Legislative Council (1862-1867)

{| border="1" cellpadding="5" cellspacing="0" style="border-collapse: collapse border-color: #444444"
|- bgcolor="darkgray"
| 
|Name
|Party
|Election 

|Charles-Christophe MalhiotParti rouge1862
|}

See also
Division of Shawinigan (Legislative Council)
History of Canada
History of Quebec
Politics of Canada
Politics of Quebec
Senatorial Division of Shawinigan
Shawinigan
Trois-Rivières

Footnotes

Electoral districts of Canada East